XHADM-FM is a community radio station on 88.1 FM in Ahualulco de Mercado, Jalisco, Mexico. It is owned by Comunicación y Cultura Ahualulco de Mercado, A.C. and branded as Más FM.

History
Más FM was among the first new stations to receive a social use concession under the terms of the 2014 telecommunications reforms, becoming XHADM-FM on the same frequency of 88.1.

References

External links
Más FM on Facebook

2015 establishments in Mexico
Radio stations in Jalisco
Community radio stations in Mexico
Radio stations established in 2015
Spanish-language radio stations